Loup Diwan Gueho (born 24 May 2004) is a French professional footballer who plays for Paris FC.

Club career 
Having come trough the youth ranks of the Maisons-Alfort team, CAP Charenton and Paris Saint-Germain, he joined the Paris FC academy as a 10 years old. There he signed a youth contract in September 2021, tying him to the Parisian club until 2024.

Loup Diwan Gueho made his professional debut for Paris FC on the 14 November 2021, replacing Florent Hanin, during a 2–2 away Coupe de France draw against CS Sedan.

He made his Ligue 2 debut on the 1 February 2022, replacing Jaouen Hadjam during a 2–1 away win to AJ Auxerre.

International career 
Loup Diwan Gueho is a youth international with France, having been called to the under-17 team in February 2021, playing a friendly game against US Orléans's U17, scoring a goal in this 7-0 win, as most junior competitions were canceled because of covid.

References

External links

2004 births
Living people
French footballers
Association football defenders
People from Bourg-la-Reine
Paris FC players
Ligue 2 players
Footballers from Hauts-de-Seine